Holdenville is a city in and county seat of  Hughes County, Oklahoma, United States. The population was 5,771 at the 2010 census, an increase of 22 percent from 4,732 at the 2000 census.

It is home to The Pork Group, a subsidiary of Tyson Foods; the Holdenville State Fish Hatchery, one of four operated by the Oklahoma Department of Wildlife Conservation; the Davis Correctional Facility, a 1,600 bed medium security prison operated by the Corrections Corporation of America; and the Creek Nation Casino, one of many operated by the Muscogee (Creek) Nation.

History
Holdenville traces its origin to a Creek settlement called echo, which means "deer" in English. George B. Fentress operated a general store there. A post office called "Fentress" opened there on May 24, 1895. The Choctaw, Oklahoma and Gulf Railroad was constructed in the 1890s from Arkansas to Indian Territory. Between 1895 and 1897, the construction passed through the Creek Nation. During this period, a railroad camp was set up to service the railroad construction. The railroad workers called the camp "Holden" in honor of J.F. Holden, the Auditor and Traffic Manager of Choctaw, Oklahoma, and Gulf Railroad. In 1895, a request was delivered to the U.S. Congress to establish a post office in Holden. The request was rejected because the name was too similar to another post office called "Holder." The proposed name was then altered to "Holdenville" and was accepted.

In 1898, settlers petitioned Indian Territory to incorporate Holdenville as a town. A hearing was granted and on November 14, 1898, Holdenville was incorporated as part of Indian Territory.  D. J. Red was elected mayor at the first municipal election, held December 27, 1898. The first city council meeting was held  January 4, 1899.  The St. Louis, Oklahoma and Southern Railway (later the St. Louis and San Francisco Railway) constructed a line between 1900 and 1901 from Sapulpa to the Red River that passed through Holdenville.  An election was held on June 27, 1908, to determine the permanent county seat. Contending communities were Holdenville, Wetumka, Calvin, and Lamar. None of the candidates won a majority, so a runoff election was held on September 10, 1908, between the two top vote-getters, Holdenville and Wetumka. This time, Holdenville won the election.

Until it was named in a grand jury investigation in 1904, Holdenville was a sundown town where African Americans were not allowed to live or even wait for a train.

Geography
Holdenville is located at  (35.084199, -96.400305).

Holdenville sits approximately five miles north of the Holdenville City Lake, eight miles north of the Canadian River, and six miles north of the Little River. The area is mostly wooded and flanked by gently rolling hills, interrupted occasionally by small creeks and streams.

Climate

Highways
 U.S. Route 270
 State Highway 48

Airports
The Holdenville Municipal Airport is about 1 mile northwest of the town.  It has existed since 1943, and Central Airlines made it a regularly-scheduled stop in the 1950s.

Commercial air service is available out of Will Rogers World Airport, about 81 miles west-northwest.

Railroads
The BNSF Railway Company

Demographics

As of the census of 2000, there were 4,732 people, 1,966 households, and 1,236 families residing in the city. The population density was 975.9 people per square mile (376.7/km). There were 2,302 housing units at an average density of 474.7 per square mile (183.3/km). The racial makeup of the city was 75.06% White, 3.44% African American, 14.48% Native American, 0.27% Asian, 0.99% from other races, and 5.75% from two or more races. Hispanic or Latino of any race were 2.45% of the population.

There were 1,966 households, out of which 28.4% had children under the age of 18 living with them, 44.3% were married couples living together, 14.6% had a female householder with no husband present, and 37.1% were non-families. 34.2% of all households were made up of individuals, and 20.0% had someone living alone who was 65 years of age or older. The average household size was 2.31 and the average family size was 2.96.

In the city, the population was spread out, with 24.7% under the age of 18, 8.4% from 18 to 24, 23.2% from 25 to 44, 20.5% from 45 to 64, and 23.2% who were 65 years of age or older. The median age was 40 years. For every 100 females, there were 81.2 males. For every 100 females age 18 and over, there were 76.7 males.

The median income for a household in the city was $20,282, and the median income for a family was $27,175. Males had a median income of $21,020 versus $17,951 for females. The per capita income for the city was $13,326. About 14.8% of families and 20.2% of the population were below the poverty line, including 21.2% of those under age 18 and 18.4% of those age 65 or over.

Education
Primary and Secondary education in and around the city are provided by Holdenville Public Schools and Moss Public Schools.

Economy
Historically, the Holdenville area economy has been based on agriculture. The main crops have been cotton, peanuts, pecans, corn, hay, oats, sweet and Irish potatoes and orchard fruits. Other types of business have supplemented the economy. Covey Corporation manufactured plastic products and employed approximately one hundred fifty workers. Other enterprises included Seamprufe Corporation, a manufacturer of lingerie, and F. B. Fly Company, a producer of fishing tackle. Aquafarms, a catfish processing plant, and the Holdenville State Fish Hatchery also provided employment. In the 1990s Tyson Foods' hog breeding operation and the Earl A. Davis Community Work Center created jobs.

Recreation
Since May 1934 nearby Holdenville Lake has offered outdoor recreational activities.

Fall Festival
Holdenville celebrates the annual Fall Festival on the first Saturday in October. The Festival includes a parade, classic car show, and an open-air market fair with dozens of booths and vendors.  The Fall Festival was originally called Hog Wild Day to celebrate Tyson's contribution to Holdenville's economy, and featured a hog-calling contest, a pigtail contest, a pig-out pie-eating contest, and a greased pig contest.

Stroup Park
Stroup Park is the primary recreation area in Holdenville. It contains a playground, baseball diamond, public swimming pool, basketball court, tennis court, skate park, two pavilions, disc golf course, and numerous picnic tables. There is also a one-mile walking path, duck pond, and a smaller adjacent park called Rose Park which mainly consists of flower gardens.

Holdenville City Lake
Holdenville City Lake, in addition to providing 80% of the drinking water in Hughes County, is the area's main source of aquatic and woodland recreation. The lake is surrounded by campsites, some of which are equipped with RV hook-ups. There is also a public bath house with restrooms and showers. The lake has two docks, one is covered and reserved for fishing, the other is open-air and used for boat docking. Boats and jet skis are allowed on the lake, but only in certain areas. Tubing, knee-boarding and water skiing are allowed depending on the water level. There are also numerous ATV trails in the vicinity.

Notable people
 Daren Brown, Seattle Mariners manager
 Jackie Brown, Major League Baseball pitcher and pitching coach (uncle of Daren Brown)
 Zora Kramer Brown, breast cancer awareness advocate
 Dave Cox, California State Senator
 "Dizzy" Dean, Major League Baseball pitcher
 Clu Gulager, actor
 Sterlin Harjo, filmmaker
 Jack Jacobs, Canadian Football League quarterback
 Constance N. Johnson, Oklahoma State Senator
 Richard Jordan, NFL player
 Velma Middleton, jazz singer
 T. Boone Pickens, billionaire oil and gas businessman
 Dave Redding, NFL assistant coach
 Bjo Trimble, Science fiction fan and writer

References

External links
 
 Encyclopedia of Oklahoma History and Culture - Holdenville

Cities in Oklahoma
Cities in Hughes County, Oklahoma
County seats in Oklahoma
Sundown towns in Oklahoma